Navidi Vakhsh was a pro-Islamic, Tajik-language thrice-weekly newspaper of Tajikistan.

A number of its reporters were murdered during the country's 1992-1997 civil war, leading The Committee to Protect Journalists to award it the International Press Freedom Award, "an annual recognition of courageous journalism". A CPJ report later found "official complicity" in the murder of at least four Navidi Vakhsh staffers.

References

Newspapers published in Tajikistan